The 2000–01 Djurgårdens IF Hockey season was the season when Djurgården lost several key players to the NHL, but with new players like slovak Vladimir Orszagh from New York Islanders and Andreas Salomonsson from Modo, Djurgården defended the championship from last season. Djurgården took their 16th title.

Playoffs

Player stats

Regular season

Skaters Top-10
Note: GP = Games played; G = Goals; A = Assists; Pts = Points; +/- = Plus/Minus; PIM = Penalty Minutes;

Player stats

Playoffs

Skaters Top-10
Note: GP = Games played; G = Goals; A = Assists; Pts = Points; +/- = Plus/Minus; PIM = Penalty Minutes; 

stats.swehockey

References

2000-01
2000–01 in Swedish ice hockey